Cypriots men football teams have participated in UEFA competitions since season 1963–64. Before that, Cyprus Football Association joined UEFA in 1962. Cypriot teams have participated in four European competitions: European Cup/UEFA Champions League, UEFA Cup/UEFA Europa League, UEFA Cup Winners' Cup and UEFA Intertoto Cup. Altogether, 16 different clubs participated at least in one European competition.

The first decades the Cypriot teams loses with high scores. Then, they improve their results. They were qualifying over stronger teams. At 2008, a Cypriot team, Anorthosis Famagusta FC, qualified for the first time to the group stage of a competition, and since then at least one team participate in the group stage every season. Most important success was the qualification and the participation of APOEL FC at the quarterfinals of 2011–12 UEFA Champions League. Then is the present of the same team at the round of 16 of 2016–17 UEFA Europa League.

Cyprus' ranking at UEFA coefficient at the end of 2012–13 season was the 14th, the highest the country ever had.

European Cup/UEFA Champions League 
Cypriot teams began to participate in the European Cup (renamed the UEFA Champions League in 1992) in 1963. The first team that participated was Anorthosis Famagusta FC that faced FK Partizan in Belgrade on 11 September 1963.

In this competition the Cypriot Champions have taken part. Only in 2014-15 season, when due to the high ranking of Cyprus, the country had two participations in the competition, so the second team also took part.

Cypriot teams have taken part in the competition every season from 1963 with three exceptions:
 1964–65 season: The Cyprus championship was abandoned and no team was crowned champion.
 1974–75 season: As a result of the Turkish invasion of Cyprus, the three teams that qualified for European competition withdrew. In the European Cup that team was Omonoia.
 1994-95 and 1996–97 season because Cyprus did not receive a Champions League place due to its low country coefficient. The champions  (Apollon and APOEL respectively) took part in the UEFA Cup.

Eight different teams have taken part in the competition. Five times one team took part in the group stage of Champions League. Anorthosis was the first team that took part in the group stage, in the 2008–09 UEFA Champions League. APOEL were the participants on the other four occasions. The most successful team was APOEL in the 2011–12 season, when it reached the quarter finals.

The table presents the statistics of Cypriot teams in the competition.

The table presents the participation of Cypriot teams in the competitions per season.

UEFA Cup/Europa League 
Cypriot teams began to participate to UEFA Cup (which renamed to UEFA Europa League at 2009) at 1971. The first team who participated was Digenis. From 1971 until 1999 only the second team of Cypriot First Division was taking part. In two season, beside the second team, the champions team also took part due to low country coefficient. Since 1999, at the competition take part also the winner of Cyprus Cup and nowadays more that two Cypriot teams are taking part to the competition. Furthermore, in many occasions the Cyprus champions, after eliminated from Champions League continue to UEFA Cup/Europa League.

Only in 1974–75 season no Cypriot team took part to the competition. As a result of Turkish invasion of Cyprus, the three teams that qualified to European competition withdrew. In UEFA Cup that team was Pezoporikos.

Fifteen different teams took part in the competition. The Cypriot teams had seven participation to the group stage. AEK was the first team that participated in the group stage at 2011–12 UEFA Europa League. The rest six participations came from APOEL (3), Apollon (2) and AEL (1). Most successful team was APOEL of 2016-17 season that qualifies and participated to round of 16.

The table presents the statistic of Cypriot teams in the competition.

The table presents the participation of Cypriot teams in the competitions per season.

UEFA Cup Winners' Cup 
Cypriot teams participated to UEFA Cup Winners' Cup from 1963–64 season until 1998–99 season when the competition was abolished. At the competition only the Cypriot Cup winner was taking part or the finalist of the cup if the cup winner was also the champion (so had qualified to European Cup/UEFA Champions League).

The first match of a Cypriot team in any European competition was in 1963–64 European Cup Winners' Cup, when APOEL faced SK Gjøvik-Lyn at GSP Stadium (1902). Ten different teams had taken part to the competition. The best result came from Apollon Limassol at the last season of the competition, at 1998–99 UEFA Cup Winners' Cup, when for the first time a Cypriot team eliminated two teams and participated in the second round.

Only in 1974–75 season no Cypriot team took part in the competition. As a result of Turkish invasion of Cyprus, the three teams that qualified to European competition withdrew. In UEFA Cup Winners' Cup that team was Enosis Neon Paralimni.

The table presents the statistic of Cypriot teams in the competition.

The table presents the participation of Cypriot teams in the competitions per season.

 
CW1: The home matches of Cypriot teams were not take place in Cyprus but in their opponents country, but not at opponents' ground. 
CW2: The home matches of Cypriot teams were not take place in Cyprus but in their opponents country, at opponents' ground. 
CW3: The Czech teams was represented Czechoslovakia. 
CW4: The Armenian teams was represented Soviet Union. 
CW5: The Slovak team was represented Czechoslovakia.

UEFA Intertoto Cup 
UEFA Intertoto Cup was taken over by UEFA at 1995. That season the Cypriot teams began to participate in the competition, until 2008 when the competition abolished. Only in 1999 UEFA Intertoto Cup no Cypriot team took part.

In the middle of every football season, any Cypriot teams wanted to take part in Intertoto, declare their nomination and the one of them that finished in the highest position at Cypriot First Division qualified to Intertoto Cup.

In total, Cypriot teams took part in 13 of the 14 seasons of the competition held by UEFA. Every season only one Cypriot team took part except of 2003 UEFA Intertoto Cup when two teams took part. At 1995, 1996 and 1997 the teams were started from group stage of five teams, giving two home and two away matches. The two first team were qualified. From 1998 until 2005 the competition held with a knockout system. The final three winners of the competitions qualified to UEFA Cup. From 2006 yo 2008 competition also held with a knockout system but the winners that qualified to UEFA Cup increase to 11, and so more teams were able to qualified.

Most successful Cypriot team was Ethnikos Achna, at 2006. According to UEFA website, Ethnikos Achna considered as a winner of 2006 UEFA Intertoto Cup, because that year the winners were the 11 teams that qualified to 2006–07 UEFA Cup.

The table presents the statistic of Cypriot teams in the competition.

The table presents the participation of Cypriot teams in the competitions per season.

 
I1: At 1995, 1996 and 1997 teams were started from group stage of five teams, giving two home and two away matches. The two first team were qualified.
I2:Ethnikos Achna continue to UEFA Cup.
I3:The team from Montenegro was represented Serbia and Montenegro.

Statistics 1963-2017 
Last update: April 14, 2018

See also 
 Football in Cyprus

References

Sources

Bibliography

External links 
 

 
European football clubs in international competitions